The Bothwell Water is a river in the Scottish Borders area of Scotland. It rises in the Lammermuir Hills near Caldercleugh and continues past the Upper Monynut Forest, Crichness, Bothwell Hill, and the village of Bothwell, when it joins the Whiteadder Water.

See also
List of places in the Scottish Borders
List of places in Scotland

External links
1879: Bothwell Water Works pipe track, Bothwell and Powburn
GEOGRAPH image: Caldercleugh, Bothwell Water
GEOGRAPH image: Bothwell Water, Lammermuirs
The Soils and Vegetation of Lammermuir
Walking in the Lammermuirs: Bothwell Water
STREETMAP: Bothwell Water

Rivers of the Scottish Borders
2Bothwell